Gary Lee Mabee (born 1 February 1955) is an English former professional footballer who played as a forward. He began his career with Tottenham Hotspur, as an apprentice, in July 1970. After a very brief loan spell at AJ Auxerre, he moved to Northampton Town, in the summer of 1974, when Tottenham did not extend his contract.

While at Tottenham, Mabee played for the youth team and the reserves.  He was a prolific goal scorer and got a professional contract in the 1971–72 season.

When Mabee transferred to Northampton the goals kept coming but so did injuries. At the age of 20 he was forced to retire from professional football, in the 1975–76 season.
 
In his short professional career at Northampton, Mabee started 29 games and came on as substitute in four. He scored 13 goals in his first season with Northampton.

As a youngster, Mabee grew up in Oxford and attended Redefield School. He was an outstanding footballer playing for and captaining the Oxford and District County School Boys. Scouts came from Derby County and Oxford United to watch him, but he signed for Tottenham.

Mabee still has contacts with football in his role as a cameraman. At weekends, Mabee films many of the football matches in the East of England - Peterborough and Cambridge are just two of the grounds that he is often at.  His main job is as an ITV cameraman, which he has done for over 30 years.

References

External links
Nothampton Town F.C. players at neilbrown.com

1955 births
Living people
English footballers
Footballers from Oxford
Association football forwards
English Football League players
Northampton Town F.C. players